Kate Rebecca Washington (born 1970) is an Australian politician who was elected to the New South Wales Legislative Assembly as the member for Port Stephens for the Australian Labor Party at the 2015 New South Wales state election.

When first contesting the seat, Washington lost in the seat of Port Stephens during the 2011 election after suffering a 12.4-point two-candidate swing against Labor. Four years later, she won the seat with a two-candidate swing toward her of 19.5-points.

Before entering Parliament, Washington worked as a health lawyer. She has three children, and lives in Medowie.

Washington is the Shadow Minister for Family and Community Services and Shadow Minister for Disability Inclusion, following the 2021 NSW Labor leadership spill. After previously holding the portfolios of the Shadow Minister for Environment and Heritage and the Shadow Minister for Rural Health in the McKay shadow ministry. Her electorate office is located in Raymond Terrace.

References

 

1970 births
Living people
Australian Labor Party members of the Parliament of New South Wales
Members of the New South Wales Legislative Assembly
20th-century Australian lawyers
University of Sydney alumni
Place of birth missing (living people)
Australian women lawyers
21st-century Australian lawyers
21st-century Australian politicians
Women members of the New South Wales Legislative Assembly
21st-century women lawyers
21st-century Australian women politicians